Bill Duckworth (born 21 February 1959) is a former Australian rules footballer who played with Essendon in the VFL and West Perth in the West Australian Football League. He is best known for winning the 1984 Norm Smith Medal. His brother John also played league football.

Duckworth appeared 35 times for the Cardinals (as they were known up to 1982) before being recruited by Essendon. He played as an aggressive defender, often seen at the fullback position. His heroics in the 1984 Grand Final win over Hawthorn earned him best on ground recognition and he won another premiership with the Bombers the following season. Duckworth retired in 1990 and returned to West Perth.

Statistics

|- style=background:#EAEAEA
| scope=row | 1982 ||  || 22
| 20 || 6 || 4 || 145 || 100 || 245 || 48 ||  || 0.3 || 0.2 || 7.3 || 5.0 || 12.3 || 2.4 ||  || 5
|-
| scope=row | 1983 ||  || 22
| 11 || 1 || 1 || 59 || 53 || 112 || 15 ||  || 0.1 || 0.1 || 5.4 || 4.8 || 10.2 || 1.4 ||  || 0
|- style=background:#EAEAEA
| scope=row bgcolor=F0E68C | 1984# ||  || 22
| 24 || 3 || 2 || 229 || 83 || 312 || 56 ||  || 0.1 || 0.1 || 9.5 || 3.5 || 13.0 || 2.3 ||  || 2
|-
| scope=row bgcolor=F0E68C | 1985# ||  || 22
| 6 || 2 || 1 || 59 || 34 || 93 || 22 ||  || 0.3 || 0.2 || 9.8 || 5.7 || 15.5 || 3.7 ||  || 1
|- style=background:#EAEAEA
| scope=row | 1986 ||  || 22
| 14 || 14 || 13 || 129 || 50 || 179 || 40 ||  || 1.0 || 0.9 || 9.2 || 3.6 || 12.8 || 2.9 ||  || 1
|-
| scope=row | 1987 ||  || 22
| 14 || 15 || 7 || 107 || 47 || 154 || 42 || 26 || 1.1 || 0.5 || 7.6 || 3.4 || 11.0 || 3.0 || 1.9 || 0
|- style=background:#EAEAEA
| scope=row | 1988 ||  || 22
| 20 || 15 || 6 || 179 || 84 || 263 || 63 || 28 || 0.8 || 0.3 || 9.0 || 4.2 || 13.2 || 3.2 || 1.4 || 3
|-
| scope=row | 1989 ||  || 22
| 13 || 7 || 7 || 115 || 53 || 168 || 45 || 19 || 0.5 || 0.5 || 8.9 || 4.1 || 12.9 || 3.5 || 1.5 || 1
|- style=background:#EAEAEA
| scope=row | 1990 ||  || 22
| 4 || 1 || 2 || 30 || 11 || 41 || 8 || 2 || 0.3 || 0.5 || 7.5 || 2.8 || 10.3 || 2.0 || 0.5 || 0
|- class=sortbottom
! colspan=3 | Career
! 126 !! 64 !! 43 !! 1052 !! 515 !! 1567 !! 339 !! 75 !! 0.5 !! 0.3 !! 8.3 !! 4.1 !! 12.4 !! 2.7 !! 1.5 !! 13
|}

Honours and achievements
Team
 2× VFL premiership player: 1984, 1985
 4× McClelland Trophy: 1984, 1985, 1989, 1990

Individual
 Norm Smith Medal: 1984
 State of Origin (Western Australia): 1987

References

External links

1959 births
Living people
Australian rules footballers from Western Australia
Essendon Football Club players
Essendon Football Club Premiership players
Norm Smith Medal winners
Western Australian State of Origin players
West Perth Football Club players
Two-time VFL/AFL Premiership players